Addy is a surname.

Notable people with the surname include:

 Bob Addy (1842–1910), Canadian baseball player
 Bob Addy (cyclist) (born 1941), British cyclist
 Danny Addy (born 1991), English rugby league footballer
 David Addy (born 1990), Ghanaian footballer
 Gifty Addy (born 1984), Ghanaian sprinter
 Jangy Addy (born 1985), Liberian decathlete
 Lee Addy (born 1990), Ghanaian footballer
 Marian Ewurama Addy (1941–2014), Ghanaian scientist
 Mark Addy (born 1964), British actor
 Mark Diamond Addy, Ghanaian politician
 Mercy Addy (born 1964), Ghanaian sprinter
 Mustapha Tettey Addy (born 1942), Ghanaian drummer and ethnomusicologist
 Obo Addy (1936–2012), Ghanaian drummer and dancer
 Sidney Oldall Addy (1848–1933), English author of books on folklore and history
 Yacub Addy (born 1931), Ghanaian drummer, composer, choreographer and educator
 Wesley Addy (1913–1996), American actor

References